Juan Agustín Figueroa Yávar (25 November 1933 − 7 July 2016) is a Chilean politician who served as minister of State.

References

External links
 Profile at Annales de la República

1933 births
2016 deaths
20th-century Chilean lawyers
University of Chile alumni
20th-century Chilean politicians
Radical Party of Chile politicians
Radical Social Democratic Party of Chile politicians